The Taça das Nações (Portuguese for "Nations' Cup") or "Little World Cup" was a football tournament played in Brazil in 1964 to celebrate the 50th anniversary of the founding of the Brazilian Football Confederation. Three international teams were invited, Argentina, Portugal and England, for the competition which was played in Rio de Janeiro and São Paulo during late May and early June.

History 

The tournament was intended to showcase the favourites for the upcoming 1966 FIFA World Cup hosted by England. The Brazilian squad – apart from Pelé – had notable players such as Gérson, Jairzinho and goalkeeper Gilmar. Argentina, coached by José María Minella, included some experienced players such as Amadeo Carrizo, José Varacka, José Ramos Delgado, Alfredo Rojas and Antonio Rattín and young footballers such as Alberto Rendo and Roberto Telch. Silvio Marzolini did not participate due to being injured. The English team included Bobby Charlton, Bobby Moore and Gordon Banks while most of Portugal's players were from Benfica, that had won the European Champions' Cup twice, with Eusébio as its most notable star. 

In the match between England and Brazil, Pelé devastated the England defence with skill and hard running, leaving England forward Jimmy Greaves to remark, "Pelé is on another bloody planet." The England vs. Portugal game was also notable for being marred by controversy when Portuguese player José Torres attempted to punch the referee for disallowing an offside Portuguese goal. The player was sent off, but was considered lucky not to face a lifetime ban from football. In another violent incident, a headbutt by Pelé broke the nose of the Argentine player José Agustín Messiano, who had to be replaced by Roberto Telch –who proceeded to score two goals in the game.

The Argentine team eventually won the tournament after defeating Brazil 3–0 in their game in São Paulo, with goals by Telch (2) and Ermindo Onega. Argentine goalkeeper Amadeo Carrizo stopped a penalty by Gerson. 

Reportedly the Brazilian FA had already engraved the Brazilian player's names on the watches intended as prizes for the winning team.

Results

Final table 

The points system gave 2 points for a win and 1 point for a draw.

Statistics

Goalscorers

References

External links 

 Pablo Ciullini: Nations' Cup (Brazil 1964) - Match Details, Rec.Sport.Soccer Statistics Foundation, 2013-07-25
 Chris Goodwin, Glen Isherwood: Taça das Nações, Brazil 1964, England Football Online, 2010-03-14

1964 in Argentine football
1964 in Brazilian football
1963–64 in English football
1963–64 in Portuguese football
Brazilian football friendly trophies
 30-31
 01-07
1964
Defunct international association football competitions in South America
International men's association football invitational tournaments